Protein Wnt-10b (formerly Wnt12) is a protein that in humans is encoded by the WNT10B gene.

The WNT gene family consists of structurally related genes that encode secreted signaling proteins. These proteins have been implicated in oncogenesis and in several developmental processes, including regulation of cell fate and patterning during embryogenesis. 

This gene is a member of the WNT gene family. It may be involved in breast cancer, and its protein signaling is, it is presumed, a molecular switch that governs adipogenesis. Gain-of-function of Wnt10b in mouse hearts has shown to improve cardiac tissue repair after myocardial injury, by promoting coronary vessel formation and attenuating pathological fibrosis. This protein is 96% identical to the mouse Wnt10b protein at the amino acid level. This gene is clustered with another family member, WNT1, in the chromosome 12q13 region.

References

Further reading